Son of Man is a 2006 drama film directed by South African director Mark Dornford-May. It was the first South African motion picture to make its debut at the Sundance Film Festival. The film is an alternate retelling of Christ's crucifixion and resurrection set in modern-day South Africa.

Plot
During a violent raid from an ongoing civil war, Mary seeks shelter from the ensuing bloodshed. Discovering an abandoned school with deceased villagers inside, she begins to hallucinate and is visited by an apparition who informs her that she will give birth to the son of God. Mary raises her son Jesus until he grows to adulthood. Later in life, Jesus begins preaching faith which embraces compassion, while rejecting the corruption and brutality of the current political leadership. Jesus' teachings attract a handful of disciples. Soon, military occupation forces take over the land. The behavior of those who oppose their authority are monitored closely by the new government.

While intelligence agents regard Jesus as being harmless, one of his disciples, Judas, secretly meets with the authorities and convinces them that he is a threat to society. The military leadership interrogate, and later torture Jesus into giving up his preaching. He refuses, and is murdered. Mary exhumes his body from a shallow grave, as he is later set on a cross in crucified form for all the citizens of the town to view. The inhabitants sing praises in his memory, but are stopped by the military who disband the assembly. Jesus is later resurrected, and urges the natives to continue singing the praise of God in honor of his movement.

Cast
 Andile Kosi as Jesus
 Pauline Malefane as Mary
 Jim Hgxabaze as Judas

Production

Themes
The theme of the film as related by director Dornford-May, was "the story of Jesus reclaimed as an African fable; a simple concept becomes a remarkable cinematic experience in Son of Man." Dornford-May dramatised the story of the life of Jesus in the situation of contemporary Africa and asked what would happen today, if someone in Africa came forward with the same message as Jesus? He noted, "Andile Kosi plays Jesus, who is born in the state of Judea in southern Africa, where violence and poverty are rife. As civil war breaks out, Jesus demands that his followers forswear warfare and follow a life of peace."

Release

Initial screenings
The film was released on 22 January 2006, in the United States. In Europe, the film premiered in the Netherlands on 9 September 2006 at the Africa in the Picture Film Festival. It also debuted in the United Kingdom at the London Film Festival on 21 October 2006.

Reception

Critical response
Film review aggregator Rotten Tomatoes reports that 86% of critics gave the film a "Certified Fresh" rating, based on seven reviews with an average score of 6.80/10.

Accolades
Son of Man was nominated and won several awards in 2006. It received the first Veto-Jury prize at the Africa Film Festival in the Belgian university city of Louvain on 5 May 2007. The jury was selected by the student magazine Veto, which brought together seven students representing a number of faculties of the Catholic University of Leuven. The students gave the reasons for their award: "We selected a film which stimulates viewers to think and which does not leave them feeling indifferent. Musical beat, rapid rhythms, alternation of several styles and original shots ensure that the film is always stimulating. It is a film of a 'best-seller', but nothing is obvious in it; the story as we know it is turned upside down."

See also
 2006 in film

References

External links
 
 
 
 

English-language South African films
Xhosa-language films
2006 films
2006 drama films
Film portrayals of Jesus' death and resurrection
Films set in Africa
Films about Christianity